Tracey Renee Needham (born March 28, 1967) is an American actress who has acted primarily in television roles such as Paige Thatcher on Life Goes On (2nd-4th seasons; 1990–1993), Lieutenant Junior Grade (LTJG) Meg Austin on the first season of JAG (1995–1996), and as Inspector Candace DeLorenzo on The Division (2001-2003).

Biography
Needham was born on March 28, 1967, in Dallas, Texas, where her father was a homebuilder. She has three brothers.

In 1975, when Needham was 8 years old, her parents moved to Denver, Colorado, and her father's work dictated the family move back and forth between the two cities. She attended both Cherry Creek High School and Plano Senior High School, the latter where she graduated in 1985.

1988, Needham went to Los Angeles to study acting and audition for roles. She made her TV acting debut on Jake and the Fatman. After acting classes, she landed the role of Paige Thatcher, the big sister, on Life Goes On, beginning in the series' second season.

While growing up, she was always jumping into football games, wanting to be treated equally by the males and not have boys take it easy on her. She re-called her past to play the strong feminine Meg Austin in the first season of JAG. Needham portrayed a Navy judge advocate and a computer-weapons expert.

Needham married actor Tommy Hinkley in January 1995 and they have a daughter, Katie, born in 1999. Needham and Hinkley moved to Colorado to open a children's acting school.

Filmography

References

External links

1967 births
Living people
American television actresses
Actresses from Dallas
20th-century American actresses
21st-century American actresses